Lone Star, California may refer to:
Lone Star, Fresno County, California
Lone Star, Humboldt County, California